Microrhodopis is a genus of longhorn beetles of the subfamily Lamiinae, containing the following species:

 Microrhodopis albovittata Breuning, 1976
 Microrhodopis rufipennis Breuning, 1957

References

Lamiinae